Frederick William Hamilton (March 30, 1860 – May 22, 1940) was an American Universalist businessman and the fourth president of Tufts University from 1905 to 1912.  Born in Portland, Maine, he received his Bachelor of Arts from Tufts in 1880 and his Master of Arts in English literature and philosophy in 1886, in addition to an honorary Doctor of Divinity in 1889 and, from St. Lawrence University, an honorary Doctor of Laws in 1906.

As president, due to his strong opposition to coeducation, he created a separate Jackson College for women, with a separate faculty and administration.  He resigned in 1912 due to having lost the trust of the Tufts Community.  He later became manager of a forestry company and died in Boston in 1940.  He was Grand Secretary of the Grand Lodge of Massachusetts, and a member of Theta Delta Chi.

References

Tufts Interactive Timeline

External links
 
 

1860 births
1940 deaths
Tufts University alumni
Businesspeople from Portland, Maine
Members of the Universalist Church of America
20th-century Christian universalists
19th-century Christian universalists
Presidents of Tufts University